netcat (often abbreviated to nc) is a computer networking utility for reading from and writing to network connections using TCP or UDP. The command is designed to be a dependable back-end that can be used directly or easily driven by other programs and scripts. At the same time, it is a feature-rich network debugging and investigation tool, since it can produce almost any kind of connection its user could need and has a number of built-in capabilities.

Its list of features includes port scanning, transferring files, and port listening: as with any server, it can be used as a backdoor.

Features
The original netcat's features include:

 Outbound or inbound connections, TCP or UDP, to or from any ports
 Full DNS forward/reverse checking, with appropriate warnings
 Ability to use any local source port
 Ability to use any locally configured network source address
 Built-in port-scanning capabilities, with randomization
 Built-in loose source-routing capability
 Can read command line arguments from standard input
 Slow-send mode, one line every N seconds
 Hex dump of transmitted and received data
 Optional ability to let another program service establish connections
 Optional telnet-options responder

Rewrites like GNU's and OpenBSD's support additional features. For example, OpenBSD's nc supports TLS, and GNU netcat natively supports a tunneling mode supporting UDP and TCP (optionally allowing one to be tunneled over the other) in a single command, where other versions may require piping data from one netcat instance to another.

Examples

Opening a raw connection to port 25

 nc mail.server.net 25

Performing an HTTP request
printf "GET /index.html HTTP/1.0\r\nHost: info.cern.ch\r\n\r\n" | nc info.cern.ch 80
The full response (including HTTP headers) will be dumped to standard output.

Setting up a one-shot webserver on port 8080 to present the content of a file
 { printf 'HTTP/1.0 200 OK\r\nContent-Length: %d\r\n\r\n' "$(wc -c < some.file)"; cat some.file; } | nc -l 8080
The file can then be accessed via a web browser under http://servername:8080/. Netcat only serves the file once to the first client that connects and then exits; it also provides the content length for browsers that expect it. (This should work fine in a LAN, but may potentially fail with any kind of firewall between.) In some versions of netcat like netcat-traditional in Debian 8.6, you need to specify -p before the port number.

Checking whether UDP ports (-u) 80–90 are open on 192.168.0.1 using zero mode I/O (-z)

 nc -vzu 192.168.0.1 80-90

Note that UDP tests will always show as "open".

Test whether UDP port is open: simple UDP server and client
This test is useful, if you have shell access to the server that should be tested, but you do not know whether there is a firewall blocking a specific UDP port on the server.

On the listening host, i.e. on the server whose port needs to be checked, do the following:

 nc -l -u -p 4172

On the sending host, do the following – note that servname is the hostname of the listening host:

 nc -u servname 4172

If text typed on the sending host (type something and hit enter) is displayed also on the listening host, then the UDP port 4172 is open. If it is not open, you will get an error such as "Connection refused".

There is a caveat. On some machines, IPv6 may be the default IP version to use by netcat. Thus, the host specified by the hostname is contacted using IPv6, and the user might not know about this. Ports may appear closed in the test, even though they would be open when using IPv4. This can be difficult to notice and may cause the false impression that the port is blocked, while it is actually open. You can force the use of IPv4 by adding -4 to the options of the nc commands.

Pipe via UDP (-u) with a wait time (-w) of 1 second to "loggerhost" on port 514

 echo '<0>message' | nc -w 1 -u loggerhost 514

Port scanning
An uncommon use of netcat is port scanning. Netcat is not considered the best tool for this job, but it can be sufficient (a more advanced tool is nmap)

 nc -v -n -z -w 1 192.168.1.2 1-1000

The -n parameter here prevents DNS lookup, -z makes nc not receive any data from the server, and -w 1 makes the connection timeout after 1 second of inactivity.

Proxying
Another useful behaviour is using netcat as a proxy. Both ports and hosts can be redirected. Look at this example:

 nc -l 12345 | nc www.google.com 80

Port 12345 represents the request.

This starts a nc server on port 12345 and all the connections get redirected to google.com:80. If a web browser makes a request to nc, the request will be sent to google but the response will not be sent to the web browser. That is because pipes are unidirectional. This can be worked around with a named pipe to redirect the input and output.
$ mkfifo backpipe
$ nc -l 12345 0<backpipe | nc www.google.com 80 1>backpipe
The -c option may also be used with the ncat implementation:
$ ncat -l 12345 -c 'nc www.google.com 80'
Using a named pipe is a more reliable method because using -c option provides only a one-shot proxy.

Another useful feature is to proxy SSL connections. This way, the traffic can not be viewed in wire sniffing applications such as wireshark. This can be accomplished on UNIXes by utilizing mkfifo, netcat, and openssl.
 mkfifo tmp
 mkfifo tmp2
 nc -l 8080 -k > tmp < tmp2 &
 while true; do
  openssl s_client -connect www.google.com:443 -quiet < tmp > tmp2
 done

Making any process a server
netcat can be used to make any process a network server. It can listen on a port and pipe the input it receives to that process.

The -e option spawns the executable with its input and output redirected via network socket.

For example, it is possible to expose a bourne shell process to remote computers.

To do so, on a computer A with IP address 192.168.1.2, run this command:

$ nc -l -p 1234 -e /bin/sh

Then, from any other computer on the same network, one could run this nc command:

$ nc 192.168.1.2 1234
ls -la
total 4288
drwxr-xr-x 15 dummy users 4096 2009-02-17 07:47 .
drwxr-xr-x  4 dummy users 4096 2009-01-18 21:22 ..
-rw-------  1 dummy users 8192 2009-02-16 19:30 .bash_history
-rw-r--r--  1 dummy users  220 2009-01-18 21:04 .bash_logout
...
In this way, the -e option can be used to create a rudimentary backdoor. Some administrators perceive this as a risk and thus do not allow netcat on a computer. The version of netcat developed by OpenBSD that is often installed by default on distributions such as Debian and Ubuntu lacks this option due to this potential as a security risk.

ncat
Ncat is a similar tool to netcat provided by Nmap suite. "While Ncat isn't built on any code from the “traditional” Netcat (or any other implementation), Ncat is most definitely based on Netcat in spirit and functionality."

Ncat features includes: ability to chain Ncats together, redirect both TCP and UDP ports to other sites, SSL support, and proxy connections via SOCKS4 or HTTP (CONNECT method) proxies (with optional proxy authentication as well).
 Connect to example.org on TCP port 8080. :  ncat example.org 8080
 Listen for connections on TCP port 8080. : ncat -l 8080
 Redirect TCP port 8080 on the local machine to host on port 80. : 
 Bind to TCP port 8081 and attach /bin/bash for the world to access freely. : 
 Bind a shell to TCP port 8081, limit access to hosts on a local network, and limit the maximum number of simultaneous connections to 3:
 
 Connect to smtphost:25 through a SOCKS4 server on port 1080: ncat --proxy socks4host --proxy-type socks4 --proxy-auth user smtphost 25
 Create an HTTP proxy server on localhost port 8888. : ncat -l --proxy-type http localhost 8888
 Send a file over TCP port 9899 from host2 (client) to host1 (server).user@HOST1$ ncat -l 9899 > outputfile
user@HOST2$ ncat HOST1 9899 < inputfile
 Transfer in the other direction, turning Ncat into a “one file” server.user@HOST1$ ncat -l 9899 < inputfile
user@HOST2$ ncat HOST1 9899 > outputfile

Encrypted file transfer
Suppose you have an SSH tunnel, and you want to copy a file to the remote machine. You could just scp it directly, but that opens up another connection. The goal is to re-use the existing connection. You can use ncat to do this:

When you SSH in, add in -L 31000:127.0.0.1:31000 (this is port forwarding, sending everything from port 31000 on the remote machine to the same port on the local machine)
 On the remote: ncat -lvnp 31000 127.0.0.1 > file
 On the local: ncat -v -w 2 127.0.0.1 31000 < file
No extra overhead. TCP takes care of error correction. SSH has already encrypted the pipe.

Ports and reimplementations
The original version of netcat was a Unix program. The last version (1.10) was released in March 1996.

There are several implementations on POSIX systems, including rewrites from scratch like GNU netcat or OpenBSD netcat,
the latter of which supports IPv6 and TLS. The OpenBSD version has been ported to the FreeBSD base,
Windows/Cygwin,
and Linux.
Mac OS X comes with netcat installed as of OSX 10.13 or users can use MacPorts to install a variant.

A DOS version of netcat called NTOOL is included in the FreeDOS Package group Networking. It is based on the WatTCP stack and licensed under the European Union Public Licence Version 1.1.

Known ports for embedded systems includes versions for Windows CE (named "Netcat 4 wince") or for the iPhone.

BusyBox includes by default a lightweight version of netcat.

Solaris 11 includes netcat implementation based on OpenBSD netcat.

Socat is a more complex variant of netcat. It is larger and more flexible and has more options that must be configured for a given task.  On February 1, 2016, Santiago Zanella-Beguelin and Microsoft Vulnerability Research issued a security advisory regarding a composite Diffie-Hellman parameter which had been hard-coded into the OpenSSL implementation of socat. The implausibility that a composite might have been unintentionally introduced where a prime number is required has led to the suspicion of sabotage to introduce a backdoor software vulnerability. This socat bug affected version 1.7.3.0 and 2.0.0-b8 it was corrected in following releases from 1.7.3.1 and 2.0.0-b9.

Cryptcat is a version of netcat with integrated transport encryption capabilities.

In the middle of 2005, Nmap announced another netcat incarnation called Ncat. It features new possibilities such as "Connection Brokering", TCP/UDP Redirection, SOCKS4 client and server support, ability to "Chain" Ncat processes, HTTP CONNECT proxying (and proxy chaining), SSL connect/listen support and IP address/connection filtering. Like Nmap, Ncat is cross-platform.

On some systems, modified versions or similar netcat utilities go by the command name(s) nc, ncat, pnetcat, socat, sock, socket, sbd.

See also

 List of Unix commands
 Nmap
 OpenSSL
 Telnet
 Plink
 Packet Sender
 Banner grabbing

References

External links
 
 

Free network management software
Network analyzers
Port scanners
Unix network-related software
Windows network-related software
Free software programmed in C